Love Express is a 2018 Indian Odia language romantic film directed by Ramesh Rout and Produced by Sitaram Agrawal and Namita Agrawal which released in theatres on 28 December 2018. The film stars Swaraj Barik and Sunmeera in lead roles. The movie is a remake of 2012 Kannada movie Jaanu starring Yash.

Cast
 Swaraj Barik
 Sunmeera Nagesh
 Bobby Mishra
 Pintu Nanda
 Salil Mitra

Soundtrack

Music is composed by Baidyanath Dash and the lyrics have been written by Nirmal Nayak and Arun Mantri.

Release 
This Odia film hit the theatre on 28 December 2018 all over Odisha.

References

2018 films
2010s Odia-language films
Odia remakes of Kannada films